Soğukoluk is a village in the Erzincan District, Erzincan Province, Turkey. The village had a population of 305 in 2021. The hamlet of Aktepe is attached to the village.

References 

Villages in Erzincan District